Metropark Communications is the name of a telecommunications based corporation in the United States. Its popularity with small and medium enterprise started with consolidating multiple vendors into one communication package for subscribing companies.  To achieve a complete and total communication offering, in 1999, Metropark started providing local service, long distance service, internet bandwidth, cellular service, telephony systems, networking systems, computer systems, and support services to subscribing companies.  The Metropark business model became known as the Vendor Consolidation Program in 2001.

In 2003, using computer telephony integration technology, Metropark started developing high-end software applications for its subscribing companies and to the software dealer community. These applications provided additional productivity enhancing elements to small and medium enterprise companies.

In 1999, 3Com Corporation partnered with Metropark to develop a VoIP strategy, which included; sales, installation, helpdesk, training, and ongoing support for its popular NBX product line.

External links
Metropark Communications website
Metropark VoIP Telephony Software
Metropark database of product offerings
NBX HelpDesk

Companies based in Missouri